A “toxic workplace” is a colloquial term used to describe a place of work, usually an office environment, that is marked by significant personal conflicts between those who work there. Such infighting can often harm productivity. Toxic workplaces are often considered the result of toxic employers and/or toxic employees who are motivated by personal gain (power, money, fame or special status), use unethical means to psychologically manipulate and annoy those around them; and whose motives are to maintain or increase power, money or special status or divert attention away from their performance shortfalls and misdeeds. Toxic workers do not recognize a duty to the organization for which they work or their co-workers in terms of ethics or professional conduct toward others. Toxic workers define relationships with co-workers, not by organizational structure but by co-workers they favour and those they do not like or trust.

Quite similarly, Harder et al. (2014) define a toxic work environment as an environment that negatively impacts the viability of an organization. They specify: "It is reasonable to conclude that an organization can be considered toxic if it is ineffective as well as destructive to its employees".

In the United States, the issue of workplace bullying is getting increasing attention from state governments; twenty-six states have introduced a version of the Healthy Workplace Bill which provides a definition of this conduct and support for employers to address the behavior through discipline.

Studies by National Occupational Safety and Health found toxic workplace environments a leading cause of workplace violence such as "violent acts, including physical assaults and threats of assault, directed toward persons at work or on duty." Studies on this issue include verbal violence (threats, verbal abuse, hostility, harassment, and the like) can cause significant psychological trauma and stress, even if no physical injury takes place. Verbal assaults and hostility can also escalate to physical violence.

Corporate and organizational results
This phenomenon harms both the company and the other employees, including those who are not direct targets. Co-workers are distracted by drama, gossip and by choosing sides in the ongoing animosity. This can translate into lost productivity. While employees are distracted by this activity, they cannot devote time and attention to the achievement of business goals. Positively motivated and ethical employees may try to speak up to a toxic employee but this can make them a target (see whistleblower). Managers of toxic employees can feel intimidated by a toxic employee and try to appease the employee in an effort to avoid confrontation. Over time, positively motivated employees drift away from the workplace and may begin to view management as inept and ineffective. This can result in poor job performance as they begin to feel less valued, therefore less loyal to the company. 

Fellow employees may begin to experience physical symptoms from the stress and worry over whether they or someone they care about in the work place may be targeted. This can even develop into a clinical depression requiring treatment.

Prevention and resolution
Interventions to address this negative behavior in the workplace should be undertaken carefully. While fixing the problem is something that is very important and will likely be very beneficial, it must be done in a way that doesn’t cause any extra trouble. 

When toxic workers leave the workplace, it can improve the culture overall because the remaining staff becomes more engaged and productive. The process of removing the toxic employee will likely allow the other employees to become more willing to open up and communicate with each other as they learn to help support one another again. This is something that is really important for the overall culture of the company. Companies who articulate a strong set of cultural values regarding communication, respect and professionalism as well as a performance evaluation system that ranks both technical performance and the professional treatment of fellow employees are felt by HR professionals to be more resilient and stable.

See also

References

Further reading
 Durré L Surviving the Toxic Workplace: Protect Yourself Against Coworkers, Bosses, and Work Environments That Poison Your Day (2010)
 Kusy M & Holloway E Toxic workplace!: managing toxic personalities and their systems of power (2009)
 Lavender NJ & Cavaiola AA Toxic Coworkers: How to Deal with Dysfunctional People on the Job (2000)
 Lavender NJ & Cavaiola AA The One-Way Relationship Workbook: Step-By-Step Help for Coping with Narcissists, Egotistical Lovers, Toxic Coworkers & Others Who Are Incredibly Self-Absorbed (2011)
 Lubit RH Coping with Toxic Managers, Subordinates ... and Other Difficult People: Using Emotional Intelligence to Survive and Prosper (2003)
 Sue MP Toxic People: Decontaminate Difficult People at Work Without Using Weapons Or Duct Tape (2007)
 Dr. Gary Chapman, Dr. Paul White, & Dr. Harold Myra | Rising Above a Toxic Workplace: Taking Care of Yourself in an Unhealthy Environment (2014)

Organizational culture
Workplace bullying
Workplace